Rajeevan is an art director in Indian films. He is a graduate of Loyola College, Chennai.

Career
Rajeevan began doing art direction for ad films and television serials, before being given the opportunity to work in a feature film for the first time through Ameer's Mounam Pesiyadhe (2002). Soon after he won acclaim for his work in Parthiban Kanavu (2003), before associating with Gautham Vasudev Menon for the first time in Kaakha Kaakha and has since become a regular feature in the director's ventures.

Filmography

English films
Framed
The man who knew infity 
First fear

Hindi films
Shaithan
Ekk Deewana Tha
David

Tamil films

Mounam Pesiyadhe
Kaaka Kaaka
Parthiban Kanavu
Madhurey
Manmadhan
February 14
Aathi
Vettaiyaadu Vilaiyaadu
Vallavan
Sillunu Oru Kaadhal
Sivappathigaram
Pachaikili Muthucharam
Bheemaa
Vaaranam Aayiram
Pirivom Santhippom
Arasangam
Ayan
Drohi
Aadhavan
Vinnaithaandi Varuvaayaa
Paiyaa
Naan Mahaan Alla
Nadunisi Naaygal
Siruthai
Mandhira Punnagai
Sadhurangam
7aum Arivu
Rajapattai
Vettai
Saguni 
Maattrraan 
Neethaane En Ponvasantham 
Pandiya Naadu
Manmadhan
Thanga Meengal
Anjaan
Jilla
Jeeva
Yennai Arindhaal
Massu Engira Masilamani
Paayum Puli
Achcham Enbadhu Madamaiyada
Kaashmora
Sandakozhi 2
Dev

Malayalam films
Udayananu Tharam
Kandahar

Telugu films
Gharshana
Oye
Ye Maaya Chesave
Yeto Vellipoyindhi Manasu
1: Nenokkadine
Manam
Naa Peru Surya
Dhruva
Hello
Gang Leader
Sye Raa Narasimha Reddy
Vakeel Saab
Hari Hara Veera Mallu (Along with Thota Tharani)

References

Indian art directors
Tamil film directors
Living people
1969 births
Tamil Nadu State Film Awards winners